Acorna's Search (2001) is a science fantasy novel by American writers Anne McCaffrey and Elizabeth Ann Scarborough. It was the fifth in the Acorna Universe series initiated by McCaffrey and Margaret Ball in Acorna: The Unicorn Girl (1997). Search was preceded by Acorna's World and followed by Acorna's Rebels.

Plot summary

The homeworld Acorna has never known was horribly scarred in the brutal attack by the cold-blooded Khleevi, but the Linyaari - the unicorn girl's gentle, spiritual race - live on. Now is the time for healing and rebuilding, for restoring the natural beauty corrupted by the savage insectile oppressors. But Acorna's Linyaari friends and colleagues begin mysteriously disappearing soon after work gets under way, among them her beloved Aari. And her desperate search for answers will lead courageous Acorna to a shocking discovery beneath the surface of her people's world - and deep into the realms of limitless space, where the truth of the origin of everything awaits.

References

2001 American novels
2001 fantasy novels
2001 science fiction novels
Novels by Anne McCaffrey
Acorna